The Çapanoglu Mosque is a mosque in Yozgat City, Yozgat Province, Turkey.

Influenced by European architectural styles, the mosque was constructed in two parts, by members of the Çapanoglu family: the first part was constructed by Çapanoğlu Mustafa Ahmed Pasha in 1779, and the second in 1794/95 by his brother Süleyman.

References

External links 

 Capanoğlu Mosque

Buildings and structures in Yozgat Province
Mosques in Turkey
Mosque buildings with domes
Mosques completed in 1795

Baroque mosques of the Ottoman Empire